Hijack! is a 1975 children's drama film directed by Michael Forlong.

Synopsis
Three children are taken hostage by a man armed with a hand grenade and flick-knife. He takes them to sea aboard their father's yacht.

Cast
 Richard Morant as Colin
 James Forlong as Jack
 Tracy Peel as Jenny
 Sally Forlong as Lucy
 David Hitchen as Power Boat Driver
 Richard Kerrigan as Power Boat Mechanic
 Derek Bond as Power Boat Owner
 Robert Swales as Policeman

Production
Sponsored by the Children's Film Foundation.
The film was classified as "universal" suitable for audiences aged four years and over.

Reviews
 2016 The Children's Film Foundation: History and Legacy - "...The film is packed with enough detail to pass for a visual manual on how to sail a small craft at sea..." "...ranks as one of its best seafaring adventures.".

References

External links
 

1975 films
1970s British films
1970s English-language films
British children's drama films
British television films
Children's Film Foundation
Films directed by Michael Forlong